The British Society for Eighteenth-Century Studies (BSECS) is an interdisciplinary scholarly society founded in 1971 and based in the United Kingdom which promotes the study of all aspects of eighteenth-century history and culture. Its members are both academics and members of the public from all over the world with a diverse range of interests in the history, literature, art history, architecture, music, science, and wider culture of the long eighteenth century between approximately 1660 and 1820. BSECS is an affiliate of the International Society for Eighteenth-Century Studies (ISECS).

The society's official journal is The Journal for Eighteenth-Century Studies (JECS). It was founded in 1974 and is currently published by Wiley-Blackwell. It is a leading scholarly journal in the field of long eighteenth-century studies, and publishes essays and reviews in eighteenth-century literature, history, and culture from scholars based across the world. It is received by all the Society's members, and is subscribed to by many individuals and institutions, including many university libraries. All volumes of JECS are available in both printed and electronic format.

The society organizes an annual three-day conference in January, normally held at St Hugh's College, Oxford, which is attended by scholars from across the world. It also offers a range of fellowships and bursaries to support research into eighteenth-century history, literature, and culture.

Presidents 

The current president (from 2021) is Brycchan Carey. Past presidents include:

2018 Caroline Warman

2015 Matthew Grenby

2013 Jeremy Gregory

2010 Michael Burden

2008 Penelope Corfield

2006 John Dunkley

2004 Frank O’Gorman

2002 Derek Hughes

2000 Janet Todd

1998 Brean Hammond

External links
The British Society for Eighteenth-Century Studies
Journal for Eighteenth-Century Studies

Literary societies
History organisations based in the United Kingdom